Avant Pop is the fourth album by Lester Bowie recorded for ECM and the second album by his "Brass Fantasy" group. It was released in 1986 and features performances by Bowie, Vincent Chancey, Frank Lacy, Rasul Siddik, Steve Turre, Malachi Thompson, Stanton Davis, Bob Stewart and Phillip Wilson.

Reception
The Allmusic review by Michael G. Nastos awarded the album 2½ stars, stating, "B+ Lester, highlight "The Emperor."".

Track listing
 "The Emperor" (Turre) - 10:34  
 "Saving All My Love for You" (Gerry Goffin, Michael Masser) - 5:08  
 "B Funk" - 3:50  
 "Blueberry Hill" (Al Lewis, Vincent Rose, Larry Stock) - 5:26  
 "Crazy" (Willie Nelson) - 5:28  
 "Macho" (Turre) - 6:20  
 "No Shit" - 5:14  
 "Oh, What a Night" (Johnny Funches, Marvin Junior) - 5:33  
All compositions by Lester Bowie except as indicated 
Recorded at Tonstudio Bauer, Ludwigsburg, Germany, March 1986

Personnel
Lester Bowie: trumpet
Vincent Chancey: French horn
Frank Lacy: trombone
Rasul Siddik: trumpet
Steve Turre: trombone 
Malachi Thompson: trumpet 
Stanton Davis: trumpet, flugelhorn 
Bob Stewart: tuba
Phillip Wilson: drums

References

1986 albums
Lester Bowie albums
ECM Records albums
Albums produced by Manfred Eicher